Michael Anthony Arbib (born May 28, 1940) is an American computational neuroscientist.  He is an Adjunct Professor of Psychology at the University of California at San Diego and professor emeritus at the University of Southern California; before his 2016 retirement he was the Fletcher Jones Professor of computer science, as well as a professor of biological sciences, biomedical engineering, electrical engineering, neuroscience and psychology.

Early life and education
Arbib was born in England on May 28, 1940, the oldest of four children.  His parents moved to New Zealand when he was about 7, and on to Australia when he was about 9.  
Arbib was educated in New Zealand and at The Scots College in Sydney, Australia.  In 1960 he took a BSc (Hons) at the University of Sydney, with the University Medal in Pure Mathematics.

Arbib received his PhD in Mathematics from the Massachusetts Institute of Technology in 1963. He was advised by Norbert Wiener, the founder of cybernetics, and Henry McKean. As a student, he also worked with Warren McCulloch, the co-inventor of the artificial neural network and finite-state machine.

Career
Following his PhD, Arbib moved to Stanford for a postdoc with Rudolf E. Kálmán.  Arbib spent five years at Stanford, before moving to become becoming the founding chairman of the Department of Computer and Information Science at the University of Massachusetts Amherst in 1970. He remained in the Department until 1986, when he joined the University of Southern California.  He retired and was granted emeritus status in 2016.

Arbib's collected papers from the period 1960 through 1985 are held by the University of Massachusetts Amherst.

Awards and honors
In 1992, Arbib was elected a Fellow of the Association for the Advancement of Artificial Intelligence for "his work in schema theory and neural networks to provide a linking methodology between distributed artificial intelligence and brain theory."
In 2008, Arbib was elected a Fellow of the American Association for the Advancement of Science.

Selected bibliography

Authored and co-authored books 
 (1968) Algebraic Theory of Machines, Languages and Semigroups 
 (1969) Theories of abstract automata Prentice-Hall 
 (1973) with Louis Padulo System Theory. A Unified State-space Approach to Continuous and Discrete Systems Saunders 
 (1975) with Ernest G. Manes Arrows, Structures, and Functors: The Categorical Imperative Academic Press 
 (1978) with Suad Alagic The Design of Well-Structured and Correct Programs Springer 
 (1981) with A.J. Kfoury and Robert N. Moll A Basis for Theoretical Computer Science Springer 
 (1982) with A.J. Kfoury and Robert N. Moll A Programming Approach to Computability Springer 
 (1984) Computers and the Cybernetic Society Second Edition" Academic Press  (First edition 1977)
 (1985) In Search of the Person: Philosophical Explorations in Cognitive Science UMass 
 (1986) with Ernest G. Manes Algebraic Approaches to Program Semantics Springer 
 (1986) with Mary B. Hesse The Construction of Reality CUP 
 (1987) with E. Jeffrey Conklin and Jane C. Hill From Schema Theory to Language OUP 
 (1987) Brains, Machines, and Mathematics Second Edition Springer  (First edition McGraw-Hill 1964 LC 63-21473)
 (1988) with Robert N. Moll and A.J. Kfoury An Introduction to Formal Language Theory Springer 
 (1989) The Metaphorical Brain Second Edition" Wiley  (First edition Wiley 1972 
 (2005) Beyond the Mirror: Biology and Culture in the Evolution of Brain and Language OUP 
 (2012) How the Brain Got Language: The Mirror System Hypothesis OUP

Edited books 
 (1982) with David Caplan and John C. Marshall Neural Models of Language Processes Academic Press 
 (1984) with Oliver G. Selfridge and Edwina L. Rissland Adaptive Control of Ill-Defined Systems Plenum Press  (Proc. Nato Conference Series. II, Systems Science, V. 16, June 21–26, 1981 Devon, England)
 (2003) The Handbook of Brain Theory and Neural Networks 2nd Edition MIT  (First edition MIT 1995 0-262-01148-4)
 (2005) with Jean-Marc Fellous Who Needs Emotions: The Brain Meets the Robot OUP

Other publications 

 Dynamic Interactions in Neural Networks: Models and Data (Research Notes in Neural Computing) by Michael A. Arbib, Shun-Ichi Amari (1 January 1989)
Vision, Brain, and Cooperative Computation by Michael A. Arbib (Editor), Allen R. Hanson (Editor) (24 January 1990)
Natural and Artificial Parallel Computation by Michael A. Arbib (Editor), J. Alan Robinson (Editor) (Hardcover – 21 December 1990)
Neuroscience: From Neural Networks to Artificial Intelligence : Proceedings of a US-Mexico Seminar Held in the City of Xalapa in the State of Verac (Lecture Notes in Mathematics) by Pablo Rudomin, et al. (1 June 1993)
Neural Organization: Structure, Function, and Dynamics by Michael A. Arbib, Péter Érdi and János Szentágothai et al. (31 October 1997)
Neuroscience and the Person: Scientific Perspectives on Divine Action (Scientific Perspectives on Divine Action Series) by Robert J. Russell, et al. (1 January 2000)
Computing the Brain: A Guide to Neuroinformatics by Michael Arbib, Jeffrey S. Grethe (15 March 2001)
The Neural Simulation Language: A System for Brain Modeling by Alfredo Weitzenfeld, et al. (1 July 2002)
Visual Structures and Integrated Functions (Research Notes in Neural Computing, No 3) by Michael A. Arbib, Jorg-Peter Ewert
Visuomotor Coordination: Amphibians, Comparisons, Models, and Robots by Jorg Peter Ewert, Michael A. Arbib

References

External links

1940 births
Living people
American cognitive scientists
British emigrants to the United States
University of Massachusetts Amherst faculty
University of Southern California faculty